The 1962–63 season is the 83rd season of competitive football by Rangers.

Overview
Rangers played a total of 54 competitive matches during the 1962–63 season.

Results
All results are written with Rangers' score first.

Scottish First Division

Scottish Cup

League Cup

European Cup Winners Cup

Appearances

See also
 1962–63 in Scottish football
 1962–63 Scottish Cup
 1962–63 Scottish League Cup
 1962–63 European Cup Winners' Cup

References

External links
 Video clip of the Scottish Cup final by Pathé News

Scottish football championship-winning seasons
Rangers F.C. seasons
Rangers